In European terminology, the Far East is the geographical region that includes East and Southeast Asia as well as, to a lesser extent, North Asia, particularly the Russian Far East. South Asia is sometimes also included for economic and cultural reasons.

The term first came into use in European geopolitical discourse in the 15th century, particularly the British, denoting the Far East as the "farthest" of the three "Easts", beyond the Near East and the Middle East. Likewise, during the Qing dynasty of the 19th and early 20th centuries, the term "Tàixī" – i.e., anything further west than the Arab world – was used to refer to the Western countries. 

Since the mid-20th century, the term has mostly gone out of use for the region in international mass media outlets due to its eurocentric connotations. The Russian Far East is sometimes excluded due to cultural and ethnic differences.

Popularization 
Among Western Europeans, prior to the colonial era, Far East referred to anything further east than the Middle East. In the 16th century, King John III of Portugal called India a "rich and interesting country in the Far East." The term was popularized during the period of the British Empire as a blanket term for lands to the east of British India.

In pre-World War I European geopolitics, Near East referred to the relatively nearby lands of the Ottoman Empire, Middle East denoted north-western South Asia and Central Asia, and the Far East meant countries along the western Pacific Ocean and eastern Indian Ocean. Many European languages have analogous terms, such as the French, Spanish, Portuguese, German, Italian, Polish, Norwegian and Dutch.

Cultural and geographic meaning 
Significantly, the term evokes cultural as well as geographic separation; the Far East is not just geographically distant, but also culturally exotic. It never refers, for instance, to the culturally Western nations of Australia and New Zealand, which lie even farther to the east of Europe than East Asia itself. This combination of cultural and geographic subjectivity was well illustrated in 1939 by Robert Menzies, a Prime Minister of Australia. Reflecting on his country's geopolitical concerns with the onset of war, Menzies commented that: "The problems of the Pacific are different. What Great Britain calls the Far East is to us the Near North."

Far East, in its usual sense, is comparable to terms such as the Orient (Latin for "East"), Eastern world, or simply the East, all of which may refer, broadly, to East and South-East Asia in general. Occasionally, albeit more in the past, the Russian Far East and South Asia have been deemed to be part of the Far East.

Commenting on such terms, John K. Fairbank and Edwin O. Reischauer (both professors of East Asian Studies at Harvard University) wrote, in East Asia: The Great Tradition:

Today, the term remains in the names of some longstanding institutions, including the Far Eastern Federal University in Vladivostok, Far Eastern University in Manila, the Far East University in South Korea, and Far East, the periodical magazine of the Missionary Society of St. Columban. Furthermore, the United States and United Kingdom have historically incorporated Far East in the names of several military units and commands in the region, such as the British Royal Navy's Far East Fleet, for instance.

Territories and regions conventionally included in the Far East

Cities

See also 

 Asia-Pacific
 East Asia
 East Asian cultural sphere
 East–West dichotomy
 Far West, a term for Europe
 Four Asian Tigers – Hong Kong, Singapore, South Korea and Taiwan
 Greater East Asia Co-Prosperity Sphere, Japanese idea from the 1930s–1940s
 Inner Asia
 List of Mongol states
 List of Turkic dynasties and countries
 North Asia
 Russian Far East
 Siberia
 Ural (region)
 Northeast Asia
 Orient
 South Asia
 Southeast Asia
 Tropical Asia
 Turkic migration

Organizations
 ASEAN+3
 Comprehensive Economic Partnership for East Asia
 East Asian Community
 Regional Comprehensive Economic Partnership 
 Southeast Asian Fisheries Development Center

References

Further reading 
 Burghart, Sabine, Denis Park, and Liudmila Zakharova. "The DPRK’s economic exchanges with Russia and the EU since 2000: an analysis of institutional effects and the case of the Russian Far East." Asia Europe Journal 18.3 (2020): 281–303. on North Korea

 Clyde, Paul Hibbert, and Burton F. Beers. The Far East: A History of Western Impacts and Eastern Responses, 1830–1975 (1975). online
 Crofts, Alfred. A history of the Far East (1958) online
 Fairbank, John K., Edwin Reischauer, and Albert M. Craig. East Asia: The great tradition and East Asia: The modern transformation (1960) [2 vol 1960] online, famous textbook. 
 Green, Michael. By More Than Providence: Grand Strategy and American Power in the Asia Pacific Since 1783 (2019)  excerpt
 Iriye, Akira. After Imperialism; The Search for a New Order in the Far East 1921–1931. (1965).
 Keay, John. Empire's End: A History of the Far East from High Colonialism to Hong Kong (Scribner, 1997). online

 Louis, Wm Roger. "The road to Singapore: British imperialism in the Far East, 1932–42." in The fascist challenge and the policy of appeasement (Routledge, 2021) pp. 352–388.
 Macnair, Harley F. & Donald Lach. Modern Far Eastern International Relations. (2nd ed 1955) 1950 edition online free, 780pp; focus on 1900–1950.
 Norman, Henry. The Peoples and Politics of the Far East: Travels and studies in the British, French, Spanish and Portuguese colonies, Siberia, China, Japan, Korea, Siam and Malaya (1904) online
 Paine, S. C. M. The Wars for Asia, 1911–1949 (2014) excerpt
 Ring, George C. Religions of the Far East: Their History to the Present Day (Kessinger Publishing, 2006).
 Solomon, Richard H., and Masataka Kosaka, eds. The Soviet Far East military buildup: nuclear dilemmas and Asian security (Routledge, 2021).
 Stephan, John J. The Russian Far East (Stanford University Press, 2022).

 Vinacke, Harold M.  A History of the Far East in Modern Times (1964) online free
 Vogel, Ezra. China and Japan: Facing History (2019)  excerpt
 Woodcock, George. The British in the Far East (1969) online.

Regions of Asia
Regions of Eurasia
Geographical regions
North Asia
Southeast Asia
East Asia
Asia-Pacific
Eurocentrism